USDA is the United States Department of Agriculture.

USDA may also refer to:

Union Solidarity and Development Association, a mass organisation in Myanmar
United States Attorney, sometimes called United States District Attorneys
U.S. Soccer Development Academy, former United States soccer league
United Streets Dopeboyz of America, a rap group led by Young Jeezy, which also features artists such as Slick Pulla & Blood Raw
Universal Scene Description, .usda (ASCII-encoded) file format
The ICAO code for Sabetta International Airport in Yamalo-Nenets Autonomous Okrug, Russia